Ratusz Arsenał is a station on Line M1 of the Warsaw Metro, Poland, located under the Plac Bankowy (English: Bank Square) in the borough of Śródmieście. The station was opened on 11 May 2001 as the northern terminus of the extension from Centrum. On 20 December 2003 the line was extended further north to Dworzec Gdański. It takes its name from the Warsaw City Hall (Polish: Ratusz) located on the western side of the square. Warsaw Arsenal is also located near the station. It is the closest station to the Warsaw Old Town and the Royal Castle.

Before 29 December 2006 the name of the station was Ratusz, when it was renamed at the Government's request.

See also
Muranów (Warsaw Metro) a planned station, not built at this time, is to the north of this station.

References

External links

Railway stations in Poland opened in 2001
Line 1 (Warsaw Metro) stations
Śródmieście, Warsaw